The 1955–56 network television schedule for the four major English language commercial broadcast networks in the United States. The schedule covers primetime hours from September 1955 through March 1956. The schedule is followed by a list per network of returning series, new series, and series cancelled after the 1954–55 season.

The $64,000 Question had debuted on CBS during summer 1955 and became the #1 program on U.S. television. The three networks "rushed to copy this latest hit format, quickly filling prime time with similar contests". (It would not be until fall 1958 that it would be confirmed that several of these new quiz shows were rigged.)

For years, ABC had "struggled to cobble together a TV schedule", but following the network's major success with Disney-produced series Disneyland in 1954, other Hollywood film companies began embracing television. MGM assembled clips for MGM Parade on ABC; ABC also hired Warner Bros. for a Tuesday night program called Warner Brothers Presents. The hour-long umbrella series featured TV adaptations of three Warner Brothers movies: Cheyenne, Casablanca, and Kings Row. Of the three new series, only Cheyenne was a hit with viewers, and ABC began contracting with other Hollywood studios for Westerns. Immediately following Warner Brothers Presents, ABC scheduled The Life and Legend of Wyatt Earp. This Western was also produced in conjunction with a Hollywood studio: Desilu Productions.

CBS had its own Western hit with Gunsmoke, which also debuted in fall 1955. Over the next few years, "the rush to Westerns had become a virtual stampede so that, by the fall of 1959, viewers had their choice from a staggering twenty-eight different Western-based prime time series." Around 1955, live drama anthologies, the staple of early television programming, were being phased out by the networks in favor of filmed fare: Westerns, police dramas, quiz shows, and adventure series.

The struggling DuMont Television Network offered little during the 1955–56 television season. DuMont's final program line-up consisted of What's the Story on Wednesday nights at 9:30 and Boxing From St. Nicholas Arena on Monday nights at 9:00. By September 23, What's the Story was off the air. DuMont honored its few remaining network commitments until August 6, 1956, when it ceased operations as a major television network. DuMont hoped to go into independent television production; the company's studio facilities and Electronicam system were used to produce CBS's The Honeymooners during the 1955–56 season. DuMont's loss was ABC's gain, as some of DuMont's most popular programs, including Life Is Worth Living, Chance of a Lifetime, Life Begins at Eighty, and Down You Go, found their way onto ABC's 1955–56 prime time schedule.

The crumbling and eventual death of the old DuMont Network meant the 1955–56 television season would be the first year in which the three major remaining U.S. television networks would be the only full-time commercial participants in prime time, a situation that was to remain for the next 31 years, until Fox entered prime time on Sunday, April 5, 1987.

This was the first season that CBS and NBC aired some of their prime-time programs in color.

New series are highlighted in bold.

All times are U.S. Eastern and Pacific time (except for some live sports or events). Subtract one hour for Central and Mountain times.

Each of the 30 highest-rated shows is listed with its rank and rating as determined by Nielsen Media Research.

Legend

Sunday 

* The Ed Sullivan Show was formerly Toast of the Town. 
** formerly The Colgate Comedy Hour.

 On NBC, Color Spread aired as a monthly series, 7:30–9 p.m.
Appointment with Adventure premiered on CBS on April 3, 1955, and ran through September 1955, before starting its regular second season in the same time slot on October 2, 1955. The anthology series had no host.

Monday 

Note: On NBC, Producers' Showcase aired as a monthly series 8–9:30 p.m. No longer a network operation, DuMont continued airing its Boxing From St. Nicholas Arena on an occasional basis over individual stations until August 6, 1956. On CBS, in most areas, Douglas Edwards With the News aired at 6:45 p.m., while some cities (including New York) aired the 7:15 p.m. edition.

Tuesday 

Notes: The Martha Raye Show and The Chevy Show appeared monthly. As of November 1, You'll Never Get Rich officially became The Phil Silvers Show, swapping time periods with Navy Log.

On NBC, Dear Phoebe consisted entirely of reruns of the series from the 1954–1955 season.

Wednesday 

* Formerly Pabst Blue Ribbon Bouts on CBS.

** What's the Story aired only until September 23, before being cancelled.

Thursday

Friday 

Note: On NBC, The Best in Mystery consisted entirely of reruns of episodes of Four Star Playhouse seen previously on CBS.

Saturday 

Notes:
 On ABC, Grand Ole Opry made its debut as a monthly series, airing 8–9 p.m. from October 15, 1955, to September 26, 1956. On CBS, Ford Star Jubilee made its debut as a monthly series, airing 9:30–11 p.m. On NBC, Max Liebman Presents aired as a monthly series, 9–10:30 p.m.
High Finance, hosted by Dennis James, debuted on July 7, 1956, at 10:30 on CBS. It ran until December 15, 1956. It replaced The Damon Runyon Theater.
On NBC, the 1956 version of the summer series Encore Theatre consisted of reruns of episodes of Pepsi Cola Playhouse and Studio 57.

By network

ABC

Returning Series
The Adventures of Ozzie and Harriet
The Adventures of Rin Tin Tin
The Big Picture
Break the Bank
Chance of a Lifetime (moved from DuMont)
Cheyenne
Disneyland
Dollar a Second
The Dotty Mack Show
Down You Go
Du Pont Cavalcade Theater
Ethel and Albert
John Daly and the News
Kings Row
Kukla, Fran and Ollie
Life Begins at Eighty
Life is Worth Living
The Lone Ranger
Make Room for Daddy
Masquerade Party
The Original Amateur Hour
Ozark Jubilee
Paris Precinct
Star Tonight
Stop the Music
Tomorrow's Careers
TV Reader's Digest
The Vise
The Voice of Firestone
You Asked For It

New Series
The Alcoa Hour
Casablanca
Cheyenne
Combat Sergeant *
Crossroads
Down You Go
Famous Film Festival
General Electric Summer Originals *
Grand Ole Opry
King's Row
The Lawrence Welk Show
Lawrence Welk's Dodge Dancing Party
The Life and Legend of Wyatt Earp
Medical Horizons
MGM Parade
Outside U.S.A.
Talent Varieties
Warner Bros. Presents

Not returning from 1954–55:
Boxing from Eastern Parkway
Cavalcade of America
College Press Conference
Come Closer
The Elgin TV Hour
Enterprise
Fight Talk
Flight No. 7
Jamie
The Jane Pickens Show
Let's See
The Mail Story
The Martha Wright Show
Mr. Citizen
The Name's the Same
Pond's Theater
The Ray Bolger Show
The Saturday Night Fights
So You Want to Lead a Band
Soldier Parade
Star Tonight
The Stork Club
The Stu Erwin Show
Talent Patrol
Treasury Men in Action
Twenty Questions
What's Going On
Where's Raymond?

CBS

Returning Series
The $64,000 Question
Appointment with Adventure
Arthur Godfrey and His Friends
Arthur Godfrey's Talent Scouts
Beat the Clock
The Bob Cummings Show (moved from NBC)
Climax!
Damon Runyon Theater
December Bride
Douglas Edwards with the News
The Ed Sullivan Show
Four Star Playhouse
The Garry Moore Show
The Gene Autry Show
General Electric Theater
The George Burns and Gracie Allen Show
The Herb Shriner Show
Hollywood Talent Scouts
I Love Lucy
I've Got a Secret
The Jack Benny Show
Lassie
The Lineup
Mama
Meet Millie
The Millionaire
My Favorite Husband
Name That Tune
Omnibus
Our Miss Brooks
Person to Person
Private Secretary
The Red Skelton Show
Schlitz Playhouse of Stars
Shower of Stars
Stage Show
Studio One
Two for the Money
The United States Steel Hour (moved from ABC)
What's My Line

New Series
The 20th Century Fox Hour
The Adventures of Champion
The Adventures of Robin Hood
Alfred Hitchcock Presents
Brave Eagle
CBS Cartoon Theatre *
Crusader
Ford Star Jubilee
The Gene Autry Show
Gunsmoke
High Finance
Hollywood Summer Theater *
The Honeymooners
It's Always Jan
Joe and Mabel
The Johnny Carson Show
Navy Log
Tales of the Texas Rangers
Telephone Time *
Wanted
You'll Never Get Rich

Not returning from 1954–55:
America's Greatest Bands
Appointment with Adventure
The Best of Broadway
The Blue Angel
Danger
Father Knows Best (Moved to NBC)
Frankie Laine Time
The Halls of Ivy
Honestly, Celeste!
Life with Father
Music 55
Pabst Blue Ribbon Bouts
The Public Defender
The Ray Milland Show
See It Now
Sports Spot
Stage 7
Strike It Rich
That's My Boy
Topper
What in the World?
Willy
Windows
Your Play Time

DuMont

Returning series
At Ringside
Boxing from St. Nicholas Arena
Chance of a Lifetime
Studio 57
What's the Story

New series
Hollywood Preview

Not returning from 1954–55:
Captain Video
Concert Tonight
DuMont Evening News
Flash Gordon
The Ilona Massey Show
It's Alec Templeton Time
Life Begins at Eighty
The Music Show
National Football League Professional Football
One Minute Please
Opera Cameos
The Paul Dixon Show
Rocky King, Inside Detective
The Stranger
They Stand Accused
Time Will Tell

NBC

Returning Series
The Alfred Hitchcock Hour
Armstrong Circle Theatre
Big Town
Caesar's Hour
Camel News Caravan
The Chevy Show
Coke Time with Eddie Fisher
Colgate Variety Hour
Dragnet
Father Knows Best (Moved from CBS)
Fireside Theatre
Ford Theatre
The George Burns and Gracie Allen Show
The George Gobel Show
Gillette Cavalcade of Sports
Goodyear Television Playhouse
It's a Great Life
The Jack Benny Program
The Jimmy Durante Show
Justice
Kraft Television Theatre
The Life of Riley
The Loretta Young Show
Lux Video Theatre
The Martha Raye Show
Max Liebman Presents
Medic
Midwestern Hayride
The Milton Berle Show
People Are Funny
The Perry Como Show
Red Barber's Corner
Robert Montgomery Presents
Texaco Star Theater
This Is Your Life
The Tony Martin Show
Truth or Consequences
You Bet Your Life
Your Hit Parade

New Series
Adventure Theater *
The Alcoa Hour
The Big Surprise
Encore Theatre *
Frontier
The Golden Touch of Frankie Carle *
Hollywood Today *
The Julius LaRosa Show *
The Kaiser Aluminum Hour *
The NBC Comedy Hour *
The People's Choice
Screen Director's Playhouse
Sneak Preview *
Star Stage
Wide Wide World

Not returning from 1954–55:
The Amazing Dunninger
And Here‘s the Show
The Bob Cummings Show (moved to CBS)
The Bob Hope Show
The Buick-Berle Show
Cameo Theatre
Commando Cody: Sky Marshal of the Universe
The Donald O'Connor Show
Goodyear Television Playhouse
The Greatest Moments in Sports
The Hunter
I Married Joan
The Imogene Coca Show
The Jack Carson Show
Make the Connection
The Mickey Rooney Show: Hey, Mulligan
Mister Peepers
Musical Chairs
My Little Margie
Norby
The Philco Television Playhouse
Place the Face
Producer's Showcase
The Red Buttons Show
The Soldiers
Watch Mr. Wizard

Note: The * indicates that the program was introduced in midseason.

References

 Castleman, H. & Podrazik, W. (1982). Watching TV: Four Decades of American Television. New York: McGraw-Hill. 314 pp.
 McNeil, Alex (1996). Total Television: The Comprehensive Guide to Programming from 1948 to the Present. Fourth edition. New York: Penguin Books. .
 Brooks, Tim & Marsh, Earle (1964). The Complete Directory to Prime Time Network TV Shows (3rd ed.). New York: Ballantine. .

United States primetime network television schedules
United States network television schedule
United States network television schedule